The 2003 Open 13 was a men's tennis tournament played on indoor hard courts at the Palais des Sports de Marseille in Marseille in France and was part of the International Series of the 2003 ATP Tour. The tournament ran from 10 February through 16 February 2003. First-seeded Roger Federer won the singles title.

Finals

Singles

 Roger Federer defeated  Jonas Björkman 6–2, 7–6(8–6)
 It was Federer's 1st singles title of the year and the 5th of his career.

Doubles

 Sébastien Grosjean /  Fabrice Santoro defeated  Tomáš Cibulec /  Pavel Vízner 6–1, 6–4
 It was Grosjean's only title of the year and the 6th of his career. It was Santoro's 1st title of the year and the 14th of his career.

References

External links
 Official website 
 ATP tournament profile
 ITF tournament edition details

Open 13
Open 13